is a Japanese composer of contemporary music. His compositions mix Japanese court music with European romanticism and electronic music.

His musical career began with an experimental, mix media group called "Tone Field" in Tokyo. He studied at Nihon University of Art in the early 1970s and is primarily self-taught in composition. In 1972 and 1981, Satoh produced two other experimental projects, the latter involved placing eight speakers approximately one kilometer apart on nearby mountain tops overlooking a huge valley. In 1985, he collaborated with theater designer Manuel Luetgenhorst to stage his music at The Arts at St. Ann's in Brooklyn, New York.

He wrote his violin concerto for Anne Akiko Meyers.

He currently lives in Tokyo.

Compositions

Orchestra
 Sumeru (1982)
 Homa (1988)
 Ruika (1990)
 Toward the Night (1991)
 Glimmering Darkness (1995)
 Kami no Miuri (1995)
 Burning Meditation (1995)
 Listening to Fragrances of the Dusk (1997)
 Firefly Garden (1998)
 Kisetsu (1999)
 From the Depth of Silence (2000)
 Kyokoku (2000)
 Violin Concerto (2002)

Vocal music
 Stabat Mater (1987)

Works using Japanese musical instruments
 Chinmoku (Silence) (1977) 
 Kaze no Kyoku (Music of the Winds) (1979) 
 Ki No Koe (Voice of Tree) (1982)
 Kamu Ogui Goto (1989) 
 Kougetsu KOUGETSU (1990) 
 Snayou (1991) 
 Tamaogi Koto (1994) 
 Hi No Kyoku (1996) 
 Usuzumi (2004)

Chamber music
 Litania (1973)
 Hymn for the Sun (1973)
 Kagami (Mirror) (1975) 
 Cosmic Womb (1975) 
 Incarnation II (1978) 
 The Heavenly Spheres are Illuminated by Lights (1979) 
 Birds in Warped Time II (1980) 
 Hoshi No Mon (A Gate into the Stars) (1982) 
 Kaze No Kyoku II (Music of the Winds II) (1984) 
 Hikari (Light) (1986) 
 Toki No Mon (A Gate into Infinity) (1988) 
 Shun-Shu-Ka (Lament for Spring) (1989) 
 Lanzarote (1993) 
 Incarnation I (1977)
 Uzu (Vortex) (1988) 
 Recitative (1991)
 Innocence (1996)
 Choral (2000)

Electronic music
 Emerald Tablet (1978) 
 Mandara (1982) 
 Mantra (1986) 
 Tantra (1990)

Awards
 Japan Arts Festival, 1980
 Asian Cultural Council, 1983

References

External links
Somei Satoh (Zen-On Contemporary Composers)
Somei Satoh page from Lovely Music, Ltd. site
Recitative recorded by Guy Klucevsek

1947 births
20th-century classical composers
20th-century Japanese composers
20th-century Japanese male musicians
21st-century classical composers
21st-century Japanese composers
21st-century Japanese male musicians
Contemporary classical music performers
Japanese classical composers
Japanese contemporary classical composers
Japanese male classical composers
Living people
Musicians from Miyagi Prefecture
Nihon University alumni
People from Sendai